Rangers of the North: The Kingdom of Arthedain is a 1985 fantasy role-playing game supplement published by Iron Crown Enterprises for Middle-earth Role Playing.

Contents
Rangers of the North is a supplement that details the Arthedain Kingdom, a region ranging from the tundra of the Northlands to the Shire of the hobbits.

Reception
Andy Blakeman reviewed Rangers of the North for Imagine magazine, and stated that "All in all [...] a worthwhile addition to the Middle Earth range."

Rick Swan reviewed Rangers of the North in The Space Gamer No. 75. Swan commented that "considering how badly this could've been bungled, I.C.E. is to be commended for doing a bang-up job. And I'm betting we've yet to see the best. Until then, Rangers of the North ought to keep all would-be hobbits plenty happy."

References

Middle-earth Role Playing supplements
Role-playing game supplements introduced in 1985